Muhammad Yousuf Banuri (7 May 1908 – 17 October 1977) was a Pakistani Islamic scholar, founder of Jamia Uloom-ul-Islamia and former President and Vice President of Wifaq ul Madaris Al-Arabia, Pakistan from 30 May 1973 to 17 October 1977.

Education and career 
Yousuf Banuri received primary education from his father and maternal uncle. Then he went to Darul Uloom Deoband, India, for higher Islamic education. From Jamiah Islamiah Talimuddin Dabhel he completed his "Dora-e-Hadith" under Anwar Shah Kashmiri and Shabbir Ahmad Usmani. He served as "Sheikh-ul-Hadith" at Jamiah Islamiah Talimuddin Dabhel and as "Sheikh-ut-Tafseer" at Darul Uloom Tando Allahyar, Sindh. He founded Jamia Uloom-ul-Islamia in 1954. He also served as Emir of the Aalmi Majlis Tahaffuz Khatm-e-Nubuwwat.

Banuri's writings
Imam Tirmidhi's contribution towards Hadith, (Ma῾ārif al-Sunan) 1957 
Knowledge of the Sunnahs Introduction to the knowledge of the Sunnahs
Sunan knowledge
Fayd Al-Bari explained Sahih Al-Bukhari
Glory Al-Darari Explanation of Sahih Bukhari
Atonement for atheists in the necessities of religion'''The doctrine of Islam in the life of JesusUnrepentant in the provisions of the kiss and nichesA whiff of amber in the life of the imam of the era, Sheikh AnwarProfessor Mawdudi and some of his life and ideasAn orphan of the statement in the problems of the Qur'anHarness the beings of Ur IslamThe position of the Islamic nation on the Qadianis''

Death 
Yousuf Banuri was attending a meeting of Islami Mushawarati Council at Islamabad. His health worsened there and he was rushed to Combined Military Hospital Rawalpindi were his health worsened over two days. Muhammad Yousuf Banuri died on 17 October 1977. At his last breath, he recited the Kalimah Tayyibah with "Assalam-o-Alaikum" to the Attentive at hospital and turned himself towards Qibla.  His body was returned to Karachi. Dr. Abdul Hai Aarifi led the funeral prayer and was laid to rest in the Jamia Uloom-ul-Islamia among thousands of people, Ulama, devotees, followers and students.

Legacy 
A residential and commercial town in Karachi, originally named "New Town". It was renamed Allama Banuri Town in honor of Banori.

References

1908 births
1977 deaths
Pakistani Muslims
Pakistani Islamic religious leaders
Pakistani Sunni Muslim scholars of Islam
Muslim missionaries
Darul Uloom Deoband alumni
People from Mardan District
Presidents of Wifaq ul Madaris Al-Arabia
Jamia Islamia Talimuddin alumni
Emirs of Aalmi Majlis Tahaffuz Khatm-e-Nubuwwat
Aalmi Majlis Tahaffuz Khatm-e-Nubuwwat people
Vice presidents of Wifaq ul Madaris Al-Arabia
Chancellors of Jamia Uloom-ul-Islamia
Academic staff of Jamia Uloom-ul-Islamia
Academic staff of Jamia Islamia Talimuddin